The Tupolev TB-3 (Tyazhyolyy Bombardirovshchik, Heavy Bomber, civilian designation ANT-6) was a monoplane heavy bomber deployed by the Soviet Air Force in the 1930s and used during the early years of World War II. It was the world's first cantilever wing four-engine heavy bomber. Despite obsolescence and being officially withdrawn from service in 1939, the TB-3 performed bomber and transport duties throughout much of World War II. The TB-3 also saw combat as a Zveno project fighter mothership and as a light tank transport.

Development
Tupolev OKB started design work in 1926 with the government operational requirements finalized in 1929. The Tupolev TB-1 was taken as the basis for the design and the aircraft was initially powered by  Curtiss V-1570 "Conqueror" engines, with the intent of switching to Mikulin M-17s (modified BMW VIs) in production. The mock-up was approved on 21 March 1930 and the first prototype was completed on 31 October 1930. The aircraft flew on 22 December 1930 with Mikhail Gromov at the controls and with ski landing gear. Despite almost crashing owing to vibration causing the throttles to close, the test flight was a success. On 20 February 1931, the Soviet Air Force approved mass production of the ANT-6 with M-17 engines.

The prototype was refitted with  BMW VIz 500 engines, larger radiators, and wooden fixed-pitch propellers of TsAGI design. Single-wheel landing gear was deemed too weak and was replaced by tandem bogies with  tires. The first pre-production TB-3 4M-17 flew on 4 January 1932 with Andrey Yumashev and I. F. Petrov at the controls. Unexpectedly, subsequent mass-produced aircraft were found to be 10–12% heavier than the prototype, which significantly hampered performance. The discrepancy was discovered to be due to high positive tolerances on raw materials which resulted in steel sheetmetal, pipes, and wires being much thicker than on the carefully constructed prototypes. The aircraft were also more crudely painted with a thick layer of camouflage and lacquer. The factories asked the workers for suggestions on reducing the weight, paying 100 roubles for each  removed from the aircraft. In combination with OKB efforts, this resulted in weight savings of almost . Despite this, production aircraft could differ from each other by as much as several hundred kilograms.

In 1933, a single TB-3 4M-17F was streamlined with removal of turrets and bomb shackles, covering of all openings, and fitting of wheel spats. This resulted in only a 4.5% increase in top speed and a similar increase in the range. Tupolev concluded that streamlining was minimally beneficial for large and slow aircraft. To study the effect of corrugated skin, in January–February 1935 a single TB-3 4AM-34R had the corrugations incrementally covered with fabric. This resulted in a 5.5% gain in top speed and a 27.5% increase in the ceiling. The same aircraft demonstrated a significant increase in climb rate when fitted with experimental four-blade propellers.

Record flights
 TB-3 4M-34R set a flight endurance record of 18 hours and 30 minutes.
 TB-3 4AM-34FRN with Andrey Yumashev at the controls set a number of payload-to-altitude records:
 16 September 1936 –  to 
 20 September 1936 –  to

Design

The TB-3 was an all-metal aircraft of steel construction, as one of the designs from Andrei Tupolev's design bureau to be based on the 1918-onward all-metal aircraft design practices and technology pioneered by Hugo Junkers. The cantilever wing was supported by four tube-section spars. Any part of the aircraft could be walked on in soft shoes without damaging the skin, and the leading edges of the wings swung down to form walkways for engine maintenance. Controls were cable-actuated with a variable-incidence tailplane and a trim compensation system in case of engine failures on one side. Fixed main landing gear was not fitted with brakes. The fuel tanks did not have fire or leak protection, although the engines had an internal fire-extinguishing system. The M-17 engines were tuned to provide a maximum theoretical range of  without spark plug or carburetor fouling. Defensive armament consisted of light machine guns in five turrets — one in the nose, two on top of mid-fuselage, and one retractable "dustbin" under each wing between the engine nacelles. Later variants moved one of the top fuselage turrets aft of the tail fin.

Operational history

The TB-3 was used operationally during the Battle of Khalkhin Gol against Japan and in the Winter War with Finland. Although it was officially withdrawn from service in 1939, at the start of the Great Patriotic War on 22 June 1941, the Soviet Air Force had 516 operational TB-3s, with an additional 25 operated by the Soviet Navy. Stationed far from the USSR's western border, the ТB-3s avoided catastrophic losses during the first German air strikes, after which TB-3s from 3rd TBAP (Heavy Bomber Regiment) began flying night bombing missions on 23 June. A shortage of combat-ready aircraft also required daytime use of TB-3s without fighter escort and in this role the bombers, operating at low-to-medium altitudes, suffered heavy losses to enemy fighters and ground fire. By August 1941, TB-3s made up 25% of the Soviet bomber force and, operated by elite air force crews, were flying up to three combat missions per night. The aircraft participated in all major battles through 1943, including the first Battle of Smolensk, the Battle of Moscow, the Battle of Stalingrad, the Siege of Leningrad, and the Battle of Kursk. On 1 July 1945, 18th Air Army still had ten TB-3s on the active roster.

The TB-3 served extensively as a cargo and paratroop transport, carrying up to 35 soldiers in the latter role. In the first five months of the war, the aircraft transported  of cargo and 2,300 personnel.

The TB-3 was also used in several special projects as a fighter mothership in the Zveno project and for delivering light T-27, T-37, and T-38 tanks. On 1 August 1941, a pair of TB-3s in Zveno-SPB configuration, each with two Polikarpov I-16 fighters carrying a pair of  bombs, destroyed an oil depot with no losses in the port of Constanța, Romania. On 11 and 13 August 1941, Zveno-SPB successfully damaged the King Carol I Bridge over the Danube in Romania. Zveno operations ended in the autumn of 1942 due to the vulnerability of the motherships.

In recognition of the role TB-3 played during the war, three aircraft were included in the first post-war air parade on 18 June 1945.

Variants

Source: Shavrov
TB-3 4M-17F
The first production version, comprised about half of all TB-3s built.
TB-3 4M-34
Mikulin AM-34 engines with revised radiators, added oil coolers, several dozen built.
TB-3 4M-34R
Mikulin AM-34R engines with reduction gearboxes providing significantly improved performance, additional turret aft of the tail fin, tail wheels with hydraulic brakes, aerodynamic refinements of the wing-fuselage join and radiators, retractable wind generators.
TB-3 4AM-34RD
A series of long-range demonstration aircraft with streamlined fuselages and wheel brakes. Some aircraft had single main gear wheels  in diameter and three-blade metal propellers. Used for flights to Warsaw, Paris, and Rome in 1933–1934.
TB-3 4AM-34RN
Tested in August–October 1935 but did not enter production as the basic TB-3 design was becoming obsolete.
TB-3 4AM-34FRN/FRNV
TB-3D
G-2
Retired TB-3s with M-17 and M-34 engines converted for freight duties with Aeroflot
ANT-6-4M-34R "Aviaarktika"
TB-3 modified for the 1937 expedition to the North Pole with enclosed cockpit, single  main wheels, three-blade metal propellers.

Operators

 Nationalist China Air Force

 Aeroflot
 Soviet Air Force
 Soviet Naval Aviation

Accidents and incidents
17 March 1938
A Polyarnaya Aviatsiya G-2 (CCCP-N210) crashed on landing at Bukhta Teplits; ground fog forced the crew to perform a go-around. As a result of poor CRM the aircraft re-entered the fog. Descent was continued until the left landing ski struck snow, ripping off the landing gear and causing the aircraft to crash; all seven on board survived, but the aircraft was written off.
14 March 1941
An Aeroflot G-2 (CCCP-L1496) stalled and crashed near Begovat, Uzbekistan after the pilot attempted to climb following a loss of altitude caused by severe turbulence, killing the six crew. The aircraft was operating a Tashkent–Fergana cargo service.
27 August 1941
An Aeroflot G-2 (CCCP-L1996) struck a hill near Kizyl-Arvat, Turkmenistan while attempting to make a forced landing after the crew failed to locate their destination, killing six of nine on board. The aircraft was operating a Tashkent–Ashgabat cargo service.
26 December 1941
An Aeroflot G-2 (CCCP-L3043) crashed near Dmitriyevka (now Bayserke), Kazakhstan after the aircraft lost altitude while turning, killing 26 of 34 on board. The aircraft was operating an Alma-Ata (now Almaty)–Karaganda–Kazan passenger service with high-ranking Kazakh party and state officials. This crash is the deadliest involving the G-2.
29 December 1941
An Aeroflot G-2 (CCCP-L2010) crashed in the Amu Darya River near Chardzhou Airport after the aircraft rapidly lost altitude due to spatial disorientation of the pilot, killing seven of 36 on board. The aircraft was operating a Chardzhou–Urgench passenger service.

Specifications (TB-3 4M-17F, 1934 model)

See also

References

Notes

Bibliography
 Duffy, Paul and Andrei Kandalov. Tupolev: The Man and His Aircraft. Shrewsbury, UK:Airlife Publishing, 1996. .
 Gordon, Yefim and Vladimir Rigmant. OKB Tupolev: A History of the Design Bureau and its Aircraft. Hinckley, Leicestershire, UK: Midland Counties Publishing, 2005. .
 Gunston, Bill. The Osprey Encyclopedia of Russian Aircraft from 1875 – 1995. London:Osprey Aerospace, 1995. .
 Kulikov Victor and Michael C. Masslov. Les Bombardiers Quadrimoteurs Sovjetiques Tupolev TB3 & Petkyakov PE8 (in French). Outreau, France: Lela Presse, 2001. .

 Shavrov V.B. Istoriia konstruktskii samoletov v SSSR do 1938 g. (3 izd.). Mashinostroenie, 1985. .
 Vanags-Baginskis, Alex. "Chronicle of the Remarkable ANT-6...Progenitor of Blackjack" Air Enthusiast Number 35, January–April 1988. Bromley, Kent, UK: Pilot Press . pp. 1–18.

1930s Soviet bomber aircraft
TB-003
World War II Soviet heavy bombers
Four-engined tractor aircraft
Aircraft first flown in 1930
Four-engined piston aircraft